The Outlying Fells of Lakeland is a 1974 book written by Alfred Wainwright dealing with hills in and around the Lake District of England. It differs from Wainwright's Pictorial Guides in that each of its 56 chapters describes a walk, sometimes taking in several summits, rather than a single fell. This has caused some confusion on the part of authors attempting to prepare a definitive list of peaks. The Outlying Fells do not form part of the 214 hills generally accepted as making up the Wainwrights, but they are included in Category 2B of the Hill Walkers' Register maintained by the Long Distance Walkers Association.

The book
The first edition was published in 1974 by The Westmorland Gazette. It was republished by Michael Joseph in 1992 and a second edition, revised by Chris Jesty, was published by the Wainwright Society in 2020. 

The first edition is uniform with the seven volumes of Wainwright's Pictorial Guides, with a yellow band at head and foot of the dustjacket. The wording on the cover, in Wainwright's characteristic handwritten style, is: 
 
  

Below this, there is a pen sketch showing an elderly but sprightly walker approaching the summit of a small hill, and Wainwright's signature.

Fells included

The arrangement of chapters in the book is clockwise starting in the south east, with the first chapter devoted to Scout Scar, a walk starting at Kendal Town Hall.

The list at the back of Wainwright's book contains 110 named fells and summits. Close inspection shows seven of them to refer to other hills in the list, while Newton Fell has two summits. Thus:

Cartmel Fell is the same as Ravens Barrow (page 42).
Hollow Moor is the summit of Green Quarter Fell (page 14).
Hooker Crag is the summit of Muncaster fell (page 186).
Newton Fell includes Newton Fell (North) and Newton Fell (South) (page 53).
Potter Fell is the name given to the hill whose summits are Brunt Knotts and Ulgraves (page 8).
Lord's Seat is the summit of Whitbarrow (page 36).
Williamson's Monument is the same as High Knott (page 18).
Woodland Fell is the name of the moor of which Yew Bank and Wool Knott are high points (page 102).

The addition of the 12 nameless summits brings the number of Wainwright's Outlying Fells to 116. This is 14 more than the 102 hills listed in John M. Turner's New Combined Indexes to A. Wainwright's Pictorial Guides (second edition, Lingdales Press, 1984). Turner's list omits two tops explicitly mentioned in the book (St. John's Hill and Newton Fell South) and the 12 nameless summits, and it contains many inaccuracies.

A second edition of the book, revised by Chris Jesty, was published by Frances Lincoln  in 2011.  It maintains the same format but uses red to highlight paths on the route diagrams, and includes updated content (e.g. for Staveley Fell where Jesty says (p. 49)  "There must be many people who, encouraged ... by the first edition of this book, have turned left and ... been turned back by an uncrossable fence." before providing an alternative route.)

Highest and lowest
The highest three summits listed by Wainwright are:
Walna Scar 
Black Combe 
Great Yarlside 

The lowest summits are:
Humphrey Head , of which Wainwright says "A fell it certainly is not, being a meagre 172 feet above the sea..."
Cartmel Fell/Raven's Barrow 
Newton Fell South

List of summits

The list below has been arranged in alphabetical order rather than height in order to align as far as possible with the list at the back of Wainwright's book.  Summits are listed by the name used in the Database of British and Irish Hills, with cross-references from other summit names used by Wainwright to the entries in this table. Each summit appears only once, with height and grid reference. The "page" column allows the list to be sorted into Wainwright's order of chapters, which is roughly geographical, moving clockwise round the area from Kendal in the east.

Map
The map marks the highest point reached on each of Wainwright's 56 walks. The number adjacent to each point gives the page number of the corresponding chapter in the book and the colour indicates the general height of the summit. Clicking a number provides a link to the article about the fell in question.

See also
List of Wainwrights
List of Birketts
List of fells in the Lake District – alphabetical and height listings
List of hills in the Lake District – topographical groupings

References

Sources

External links
Wainwright Walks on the Outlying Fells
Database of British and Irish Hills
Wainwrights On The Air based on Wainwright's Hills – English Lake District
Alfred Wainwright Books & Memorabilia

Hiking books
Travel guide books
Fells of the Lake District
English non-fiction books
Walking in the United Kingdom
Geography of Cumbria
Tourist attractions in Cumbria
British travel books
Books about the Lake District